Tang Youqi (11 July 1920 – 8 November 2022) was a Chinese physical chemist who was a professor at Peking University, and an academician of the Chinese Academy of Sciences.

He was a member of the 6th, 7th and 8th Central Committee of Jiusan Society. He was a member of the 6th National Committee of the Chinese People's Political Consultative Conference and a member of the Standing Committee of the 7th and 8th Chinese People's Political Consultative Conference.

Biography
Tang was born in Nanhui County (now Pudong New Area of Shanghai), Jiangsu, on 11 July 1920, to Tang Zongtai, a drugstore owner. He attended Xinchang Primary School and Shanghai High School. In 1937, he was accepted to Tongji University, and worked at Kunming Arsenal Phosphorus Plant after graduation. He moved to Chongqing Yuxin Iron and Steel Plant in January 1943 and co-founded Chongqing Zhongsheng Electrochemical Smelter in October. He joined the faculty of Tongji University School of Medicine in August 1945. In 1946, he was admitted to California Institute of Technology, studying chemistry under Linus Pauling.

Tang returned to China in September 1951 and that same year became associate professor of the Department of Chemistry, Tsinghua University. In 1952, the Communist government carried out a nationwide readjustment of colleges and universities, the department was merged into Peking University. He was promoted to full professor in December 1963. In 1984, he was chosen as director of the Institute of Physical Chemistry, Peking University, and became director of the Beijing State Key Laboratory of Molecular Dynamic and Steady State Structural Chemistry in 1991.

On 8 November 2022, he died from an illness at Peking University Third Hospital, at the age of 102.

Personal life 
In 1952, Tang married Zhang Lizhu, an expert in obstetrics and gynecology, who bore him a son and a daughter.

Honours and awards
 1980 Member of the Chinese Academy of Sciences (CAS)
 1996 Science and Technology Progress Award of the Ho Leung Ho Lee Foundation

References

1920 births
2022 deaths
Scientists from Shanghai
Tongji University alumni
California Institute of Technology alumni
Chinese physical chemists
Members of the Chinese Academy of Sciences
Members of the Jiusan Society
Members of the 6th Chinese People's Political Consultative Conference
Members of the Standing Committee of the 7th Chinese People's Political Consultative Conference
Members of the Standing Committee of the 8th Chinese People's Political Consultative Conference
Chinese centenarians
Men centenarians